The 2000–01 Sri Lankan cricket season featured a Test series between Sri Lanka and England.

Honours
 Premier Trophy – Nondescripts Cricket Club
 Premier Limited Overs Tournament – Sinhalese Sports Club 
 Most runs – RPAH Wickramaratne 830 @ 51.87 (HS 139)
 Most wickets – S Weerakoon 80 @ 12.97 (BB 7-51)

Test series
England played 3 Tests and won the series 2–1:
 1st Test @ Galle International Stadium – Sri Lanka won by an innings and 28 runs
 2nd Test @ Asgiriya Stadium, Kandy – England won by 3 wickets
 3rd Test @ Sinhalese Sports Club Ground, Colombo – England won by 4 wickets

External sources
  CricInfo – brief history of Sri Lankan cricket
 CricketArchive – Tournaments in Sri Lanka

Further reading
 Wisden Cricketers' Almanack 2002

Sri Lankan cricket seasons from 2000–01